Ignace Nau (July 13, 1808 Léogâne - 1845) was a Haitian poet and storyteller. Born in Port-au-Prince, Nau studied in a renowned military school in Haiti before attending the Catholic University of New York. After returning to Haiti, Nau founded a literary society named "The School of 1836" with his brother, Emile Nau, and the Ardouin brothers, Beaubrun, Céligny, and Coriolan. Ignace Nau published the literary magazine Le Républicain, which was censored by the Haitian government and was later renamed L'Union.

Selected works 
 Le Livre de Marie (poem)
 Pensées du Soir (poem)
 Le Lambi (story)
 Episode de la Révolution (story)
 Isalina (story)

References 
 
 The poets of Haiti, 1782-1934, Translator Edna Worthley Underwood, The Mosher Press, 1934
 "Ignace Nau (1808-1845)", Alliance Haiti

1808 births
1845 deaths
Haitian male poets
People from Port-au-Prince
19th-century Haitian poets
19th-century male writers